Puare (Puari) is a nearly extinct Papuan language of Papua New Guinea.

References

Languages of Sandaun Province
Serra Hills languages
Critically endangered languages
Endangered Papuan languages